Peter Ernest may refer to: 

 Peter Ernst I von Mansfeld-Vorderort, Spanish army commander
 Peter Ernest Naktenis (1914–2007), American baseball player